State Field was the home stadium of the Louisiana State University Tigers football team prior to 1924. The field was built on the old downtown campus of LSU. It was located east of the Pentagon Barracks and at the site of the current Louisiana State Capitol Building. Prior to construction of State Field, football games were played on an area called the parade grounds which was located south of the Pentagon Barracks and west of Hill Memorial Library and George Peabody Hall. The field, known on the campus simply as the "athletic field", was later moved to a site with bleachers that was north of the campus' experimental garden, and next to the old armory building. The field was also used for LSU's baseball and basketball teams.

LSU football
LSU's first home game was played at State Field on December 3, 1894, against the University of Mississippi (Ole Miss). The contest resulted in a 26–6 loss to Ole Miss.  LSU's last home game at State Field was on November 15, 1924, against Northwestern State. LSU won this game by a score of 40–0. LSU moved to the newly opened Tiger Stadium the next week in a game against Tulane on November 27, 1924. During the 31 years that State Field was used as LSU's home field, 105 home games were played there. LSU's record at State Field was 83-20-2.  During most of State Field's existence, it was used only for smaller games.  Larger games were played at a baseball park in New Orleans that could accommodate around 5,000 spectators.  A good crowd at State Field was only about 1,000 fans.  In 1911, State Field got upgraded by the addition of a wodden grandstand that would hold 250 fans.  Most of the fans attending home games at State Field at the time were still accustomed to standing room only.  In 1917, State Field was moved across the street to where the current Louisiana State Capitol building is located.  A wooden grandstand that held 7,000 spectators was installed that year.  The seating was built using funds donated by an avid fan, H.V. Moseley.

LSU baseball
On May 13, 1893, LSU played its first baseball game versus Tulane University. The game resulted in a victory for LSU. From 1893 to 1924 LSU baseball played 388 games at State Field with LSU having a 192-184-12 record.

LSU basketball
The LSU basketball team played at State Field.

Gallery

See also
 LSU Tigers and Lady Tigers

References

American football venues in Baton Rouge, Louisiana
Baseball venues in Baton Rouge, Louisiana
Basketball venues in Baton Rouge, Louisiana
Demolished sports venues in Louisiana
Defunct college baseball venues in the United States
Defunct college basketball venues in the United States
Defunct college football venues
LSU Tigers baseball venues
LSU Tigers basketball venues
LSU Tigers football venues
1893 establishments in Louisiana
1924 disestablishments in Louisiana
Sports venues completed in 1893